Jakarta Cathedral is a Roman Catholic cathedral in Jakarta, Indonesia, which is also the seat of the Roman Catholic archbishop of Jakarta, currently Archbishop Ignatius Suharyo Hardjoatmodjo. This current cathedral was consecrated in 1901 and built in the neo-Gothic style, a common architectural style to build churches at that time. The Jakarta Cathedral is located in Central Jakarta near Merdeka Square and Merdeka Palace, right in-front of the cathedral stands the Istiqlal Mosque.

History

After the arrival of Dutch East India Company in 1619, the Roman Catholic Church was banned in the Dutch East Indies and was limited to Flores and Timor. The Netherlands was known to support Protestantism and tried to limit the influence and authority of the Holy See. During the Napoleonic Wars, the Netherlands, including the Dutch East Indies and its other colonies, fell under the control of the French Empire. In 1806, Napoleon Bonaparte installed his Catholic younger brother Louis Napoleon as the king of the Netherlands. Since then, the Catholic Church has been free to operate in the Dutch East Indies.

The commissary general of Batavia, Du Bus de Gisignies (1825–1830), was credited with providing land to build the first Catholic church in Batavia. The former residence of General de Kock in the Weltevredeen area was renovated to be a church. Monseigneur Prinsen blessed and inaugurated the church on 6 November 1829 and named it "Our Lady of the Assumption." The church was renovated in 1859, but collapsed on 9 April 1890.

The present church is the structure that was rebuilt between 1891 and 1901. Pastor Antonius Dijkmans, SJ was appointed as the architect. Construction was halted due to a lack of funding, but the church's new bishop, Mgr E. S. Luypen, SJ, raised the necessary funds in the Netherlands, and architect MJ Hulswit resumed construction in 1899. "De Kerk van Onze Lieve Vrowe ten Hemelopneming - The Church of Our Lady of the Assumption" was blessed and inaugurated by Mgr Edmundus Sybrandus Luypen, SJ on 21 April 1901. The church was renovated between 1988 and 2002.

A tunnel connecting the church and Istiqlal Mosque was constructed between 2020 and 2021.

Architecture

The plan of the cathedral took the form of a cross with a length of 60 meters and 10 meters wide, plus 5 metres on each aisle. It is a cathedral because it contains the "cathedra", the throne of bishop. The main entrance of the building is facing west. At the trumeau of the main portal stands a statue of Our Lady while on top of the portal there is a sentence written in Latin: "Beatam Me Dicentes Omnes Generationes" which means "All generations shall call me blessed". Besides, there is a large round stained glass Rozeta Rosa Mystica, which is the symbol of Mother Mary.

There are three main spires in Jakarta Cathedral: the two tallest ones measured 60 metres tall and are located in front on each side of the portal. The north tower is called Turris Davidica, or "Tower of David"—a devotional title of Mary symbolizing Mary as the refuge and protector against the power of darkness. The south tower, also 60 metres tall, is called "The Ivory Tower", which the whiteness and pureness of ivory describe the pureness of the Virgin Mary. On the Ivory Tower, there are old clocks that are still functioning as well as a church bell. The third spire rises above the roof's cross intersection and measured 45 metres tall from the ground, and is called "The Angelus Dei Tower".

The building consists of two floors, the upper floor can be reached from a flight of stairs in the northern tower. Originally, the second floor used to be the place for the choir during masses, but since the cathedral is quite old, there is concern that the building cannot support the weight of too many people upstairs. Today, the upper floor functions as the Jakarta Cathedral Museum, housing the relics of Catholic rituals, such as the silver cups, hats and robes of the Dutch East Indies and Indonesian archbishops and cardinals. The museum also displays the history of Roman Catholicism in Indonesia.

On the southern side, there is a statue of Pietà, describing the sadness of Mother Mary while holding the body of Jesus Christ after the crucifixion. The wall surrounded the interior has several scenes depicting Stations of the Cross. The cathedral has four pulpits for confession services, two on each side. At the centre, there is a high raised wooden podium with shell-shaped roof for sound reflection. The podium was installed in 1905 and display the images of Hell on the lower side while the images of Jesus' sermons and other scenes are on the middle side. The top of the podium displays the scene of Heaven adorned with winged angels. On the southern side, there is a large neo-Gothic style organ made in Verschueren, Belgium, then moved and installed in Jakarta in 1988. This organ was taken from Amby village near Maastricht.

There are three altars in this cathedral: on the left side is "The Altar of Saint Mary", to celebrate the assumption of Mary to Heaven. The altar was made in 1915 by Atelier Ramakers. On the right side is "The Altar of Saint Joseph", completed in May 1922. The throne of the bishop, called the cathedra, is located on the left side with three thrones. The main altar located in the centre was made in the 19th century in the Netherlands. It was moved from a Jesuit church in Groningen in 1956. In this altar, there is a main cross of Jesus and the tabernacle.

The body of the building was made of thick red bricks covered with plaster and applied with patterns to mimic natural stone construction. The large wall was made to support wide-spanned teak beams in the roof construction. The top of the spires was made from the iron frame, while the roofs were made of teak wood construction. Iron and wood are not suitable as typical neo-Gothic architecture materials usually employ stone masonry. However, these materials were chosen because they are relatively lighter than stone masonry, considering Indonesia is a region that is prone to earthquakes.

Music
There is a piano, two electones, and two playable pipe organs.

Pipe organ

On an elevated platform in the south transept sits an organ made by George Verschueren of Tongeren, Belgium, built in 1988. Draw stops were arranged on each side of the key desk and wind was activated from a stop on the left side. Manuals are of four octaves and the flat pedalboard of two-and-a-half octaves. The organ loft railing and organ casework reflect the gothic nature of the cathedral and all timbers are stained to match the existing woodwork of the church. Pipes are presented in flats with a large central tower and two flanking small towers in the left and right extremities of the case.

The stoplist of the organ is:

Manual I (56 notes/4 octaves)
 Gamba 8'
 Bourdon 8'
 Flute 8'
 Nazard 2 2/3'
 Gemshorn 2'
 Trumpet 8'

Manual II (56 notes/4 octaves)
 Bourdon 16'
 Open Diapason 8'
 Stopped Diapason 8'
 Octave 4'
 Fifteenth 2'
 Sesquieltera rk Bass
 Sesquieltera rk Treble
 Mixture IV ranks

Pedal (30 notes/2 1/2 octaves)
 Subbass 16'
 Open Wood 8'

Coupler
 I + II
 P + I
 P + II

Gallery

See also

List of church buildings in Indonesia
List of colonial buildings and structures in Jakarta
Christianity in Indonesia

References

External links

 Gereja Katedral website 
 Jakarta’s Neo Gothic Catholic Cathedral - Indonesia Travel

Churches in Jakarta
Colonial architecture in Jakarta
Cultural Properties of Indonesia in Jakarta
Dutch colonial architecture in Indonesia
Roman Catholic cathedrals in Indonesia
Roman Catholic churches completed in 1901
20th-century Roman Catholic church buildings in Indonesia